Walter Lees may refer to:

 Walter Lees (cricketer) (1875–1924), English cricketer 
 Walter Lees (golfer) (1916–2012), English golfer
 Walter E. Lees (1887–1957), American aviator